Edward Talbot was the Archdeacon of Berkshire from 13 May 1717  until 9 December 1720.

The son of Bishop William Talbot, he was born in Worcester in 1693 and educated at Oriel College, Oxford. He was rector of East Hendred from 1717; and treasurer of Sarum from 1718.

References

1693 births
Clergy from Worcester, England
Alumni of Oriel College, Oxford
Archdeacons of Berkshire
1720 deaths